St John's Lodge is a Grade II* heritage-listed private residence located in Regent's Park, in the City of Westminster, London, England. Since 1994 it has been owned by the royal family of Brunei Darussalam and is the London home of Prince Jefri Bolkiah of Brunei. St John's Lodge is located on the Inner Circle of Regent's Park, which until 1965 was in the Metropolitan Borough of St Marylebone and is now part of the City of Westminster.

History

St John's Lodge is the first villa to be built in Regent's Park in 1812 and was designed for Charles Augustus Tulk by architect John Raffield. The Royal Parks service described St John's Lodge and The Holme as the only two villas remaining from John Nash's original conception of Regent's Park, which would have included a royal palace. 

Other owners of the lodge have included Lord Wellesley, Sir Isaac Goldsmid, and John Crichton-Stuart, 3rd Marquess of Bute. The residence was occupied by the University of London's Institute of Archaeology from 1937 to 1959, and by the history and classics departments of Bedford College from 1959 to 1983. The adjoining gardens have been open to the public since 1928. St John's Lodge was bought in 1987 by the development company Messila House for 9 million who doubled it in size to  before being sold in 1994 to the royal family of Brunei Darussalam for 40 million, making it the most expensive private house in the UK.

See also

References

Bibliography

Houses in the City of Westminster
Regent's Park
Grade II* listed houses
Grade II* listed buildings in the City of Westminster
Regency architecture in London
Houses completed in 1812
Buildings and structures in Regent's Park